The Puerto Princesa Subterranean River National Park is a protected area in the Philippines.

It has been managed by the Puerto Princesa city government since 1992.              

It was listed as a UNESCO World Heritage Site in 1999, and voted as a New7Wonders of Nature in 2012. It also became a Ramsar Wetland Site in 2012.

A major tourist destination, it is mostly accessed through road trips to the seaside village of Sabang from where one of the many Bangkas (Kayaks) take visitors to the park

History 
In 2010, a group of environmentalists and geologists discovered that the underground river has a second floor, which means that there are small waterfalls inside the cave. Deeper areas of the underground river are almost impossible to explore due to oxygen deprivation.

On November 11, 2011, Puerto Princesa Underground River was provisionally chosen as one of the New 7 Wonders of Nature. This selection was officially confirmed on January 28, 2012.

Geography 

The park has a limestone karst mountain landscape. The cave includes major formations of stalactites and stalagmites, and several large chambers, including the  Italian's Chamber with approximate 2.5 million square meters volume. It is one of the largest cave rooms in the world. Until the 2007 discovery of an underground river in Mexico's Yucatán Peninsula, the Puerto Princesa Subterranean River was reputed to be the world's longest underground river.

The area also represents a habitat for biodiversity conservation. The site contains a full mountain-to-the-sea ecosystem and has some of the most important forests in Asia. It was inscribed by UNESCO as a World Heritage Site on December 4, 1999.

Flora 

The park has a range of forest formations, the thirteen forest types found in tropical Asia, namely forest over ultramafic soils, forest over limestone soils, montane forest, freshwater swamp forest, lowland evergreen tropical rainforest, riverine forest, beach forest, and mangrove forest. Researchers have identified more than 800 plant species from 300 genera and 100 families. These include at least 295 trees dominated by the dipterocarp species. In the lowland forest, large trees including the dao (Dracontomelon dao), ipil (Intsia bijuga), dita (Alstonia scholaris), amugis (Koordersiodendron pinnatum), and apitong (Dipterocarpus gracilis) are common. Beach forest species include bitaog (Calophyllum inophyllum), Pongamia pinnata, and Erynthia orientalis. Other plant species include almaciga (Agathis philippinensis), kamagong (Diospyros pulganensis) pandan (Pandanus sp.) anibong, and rattan (Calamus sp.).

Fauna 

Birds comprise the largest group of vertebrates found in the park. Of the 252 bird species known to occur in Palawan, a total of 165 species of birds were recorded in the park. This represents 67% of the total birds and all of the 15 endemic bird species of Palawan. Notable species seen in the park are the blue-naped parrot (Tanygnathus lucionensis), Tabon scrub fowl (Megapodius cumunigii), hill myna (Gracula religiosa), Palawan hornbill (Anthracoceros marchei), white breasted sea eagle (Haliaeetus leucogaster).

There are also some 30 mammal species that have been recorded. Most often observed in the forest canopy and along the shoreline feeding during low tide is the long-tailed macaque (Macaca fascicularis), the only primate found in the area. Other mammal species in the park are the Palawan bearded pig (Sus ahoenobarbus), bearcat (Arctictis binturong), Palawan stink badger (Mydaus marchei) and the Palawan porcupine (Hystrix pumila).

19 species of reptiles have been identified, eight of which are endemic. Common species in the area include large predators like the common reticulated python (Python reticulates), the monitor lizard (Varanus salvator) and the green crested lizard (Bronchocoela cristatella). Amphibian fauna include ten species. The Philippine woodland frog (Rana acanthi) is the most dominant and frequently encountered. One species, Barbourula busuangensis, endemic to Palawan was also observed in the area.

Nine species of bat, two species of swiftlet and whip spider (Stygophrynus sp.) are found in the cave, and the sea cow (Dugong dugon) and the hawksbill sea turtle (Chelonia mydas) feed in the coastal area of the park.

International reception 

Puerto Princesa Underground River was entered as the Philippine entry – and topped the first round of voting – in the New7Wonders of Nature competition. On July 29, 2011, after the second round of voting, it was declared 1 of 28 finalists. Mayor Edward S. Hagedorn extended his gratitude to all those who supported and voted for the PPUR. On November 11, 2011 it was provisionally chosen as one of the New7Wonders, together with the Amazon rainforest, Halong Bay, Iguazu Falls, Jeju Island, Komodo Island, and Table Mountain.

On January 28, 2012, Malacañang expressed elation over the official inclusion of the Puerto Princesa Underground River (PPUR) in the world's New Seven Wonders of Nature. "Confirmation that the Puerto Princesa Underground River is one of the New Seven Wonders of Nature is welcome news indeed. Throughout the competition, Filipinos from all walks of life have given time, energy, and resources to this campaign," Presidential Spokesperson Edwin Lacierda said.

Department of Tourism spokesman and Assistant Secretary Benito Bengzon Jr. said the underground estuary made it into the world's New Seven Wonders of Nature after the validation process conducted by the New7Wonders Foundation last year. The voting was criticized, especially the Philippine voting. Nothing in the New7Wonders voting procedure prohibited repetitive voting, making the results subject to government and tourism industry campaigns to vote often for local sites with the financial incentive of increased tourism. Philippine President Benigno Simeon Aquino III, in his speech during the official proclamation launch of the Puerto Princesa Underground River as one of the 28 finalists, urged the country's 80 million cellphone subscribers to vote PPUR via text.

On June 30, 2019, Puerto Princesa underground river was celebrated with a Google Doodle.

See also 
List of World Heritage Sites in the Philippines
List of national parks of the Philippines
ASEAN Heritage Parks

References

External links 

National parks of the Philippines
World Heritage Sites in the Philippines
Ramsar sites in the Philippines
Protected areas established in 1999
1999 establishments in the Philippines
Subterranean rivers
Caves of the Philippines
Landforms of Palawan
Tourist attractions in Puerto Princesa